This is a list of rural localities in Oryol Oblast. Oryol Oblast (Orlovskaya oblast) is a federal subject of Russia (an oblast). Its administrative center is the city of Oryol. Population: 786,935 (2010 Census).

Dmitrovsky District 
Rural localities in Dmitrovsky District:

 Alyoshinka

Dolzhansky District 
Rural localities in Dolzhansky District:

 Lebyodki

Khotynetsky District 
Rural localities in Khotynetsky District:

 Telegino

Korsakovsky District 
Rural localities in Korsakovsky District:

 Grunets
 Korsakovo

Krasnozorensky District 
Rural localities in Krasnozorensky District:

 Krasnaya Zarya

Kromskoy District 
Rural localities in Kromskoy District:

 Venderevo

Livensky District 
Rural localities in Livensky District:

 Navesnoye

Novoderevenkovsky District 
Rural localities in Novoderevenkovsky District:

 Domny

Orlovsky District 
Rural localities in Orlovsky District:

 Kuliki

Pokrovsky District 
Rural localities in Pokrovsky District:

 Droskovo
 Fyodorovka
 Kritovo
 Nizhny Turovets
 Setenyovo

Shablykinsky District 
Rural localities in Shablykinsky District:

 Petrushkovo

Soskovsky District 
Rural localities in Soskovsky District:

 Pechki
 Soskovo
 Yelkovo

Trosnyansky District 
Rural localities in Trosnyansky District:

 Trosna

Zalegoshchensky District 
Rural localities in Zalegoshchensky District:

 Gusevo
 Ivan
 Mokhovoye

Znamensky District 
Rural localities in Znamensky District:

 Znamenskoye

See also 

 
 Lists of rural localities in Russia

References 

Oryol Oblast